Cultural Channel (Armenian: Մշակութային Ալիք) is a cultural television company in Armenia.

History
The channel was founded by Arthur Hakobyan as A21TV on 29 March 2010 in Armenia's second largest city, Gyumri. A21TV was renamed to ART21 TV on 23 January 2014.

In 2011, it became and still remains the only cultural TV channel. In 2014, they began to collaborate with Deven, Disney, Domino, Nvero+, and other companies. On 22 June 2014, "ART21 TV" launched its new website, www.a21tv-armenia.am. Currently, their audience reaches viewers in Armenia and Russia. The channel is available on cable networks.

The TV channel, created to fill the gap in cultural and educational programming, has been carrying out many cultural programs, documentaries, and charity projects. In February 2015, the TV channel started regular IPTV broadcasts across Armenia and in the United States. In 2016, Cultural Channel organized the first cultural television competition-festival, "Cultural Channel Awards Ceremony", during which prizes were awarded to young people who won in the categories of fine arts, cinematography, and clothing modeling. In 2017, on the occasion of its foundation, the TV channel received a letter of thanks from the Ministry of Culture for its significant contribution to the popularization of Armenian cultural values.

See also
 Television in Armenia

References

External links 
 Official website

A21TV Programm on A21 TV online

 A21TV OFFICIAL

Television stations in Armenia
Armenian-language television stations
Television channels and stations established in 2014
2014 establishments in Armenia
Publicly funded broadcasters
Peabody Award winners
Television networks in Armenia